Five is the second mini-album by Japanese singer Ayumi Hamasaki. It was released on 31 August 2011, in three editions: CD+DVD, CD-Only and a limited CD-Only edition. A Blu-ray version of the mini-album was released on 9 November 2011, making Five the world's first album to be released in Blu-Ray. Hamasaki was the only lyricist on Five, and the songs were composed by multiple composers. The EP gets it title from its track listing, which consists of five tracks.

No physical singles were released from Five, making it Hamasaki's first album without any singles. However, all five songs were used as commercial tie-ins prior to the album's release. Therefore, Five really contained no previously unheard material. Five debuted atop the Oricon charts with first week sales of over 125,000 copies, becoming her eighteenth album to do so. It topped the charts for two consecutive weeks, her first album to do so since (Miss)Understood in 2006,  and was her first album to top the Oricon Monthly Chart  since Next Level  in 2009. Five was certified gold by the Recording Industry Association of Japan, but it became Hamasaki's first album to fail to be certified platinum since her career began. Five sold around 213,000 copies.

Information
Five is Hamasaki's first mini-album since Memorial address, which was released in 2003. This is Hamasaki first album not to have any singles. Its five songs had commercial endorsements prior to the release of the album: "Progress" was used as theme song of the PlayStation 3 videogame Tales of Xillia; "Another Song" was used as theme song of the TV show SweetTV of channel BeeTV; "Why..." was used in TV commercials of Taiwan campaigns of travel agency H.I.S., as well as in commercials for RecoChoku; "Beloved" was used as the theme song of August of NTV show Sukkiri!!; and "Brillante" was used in TV commercials of Music.jp.

The limited edition of the CD includes an access card to download a character costume for the PlayStation 3 game Tales of Xillia. Also, first pressings of the CD+DVD edition included a serial number to access a special website broadcasting making-of material of Ayumi Hamasaki Countdown Live 2010-2011 A: Do It Again.

Many netizens have wondered why this mini-album was named Five, if it was just because the album has only 5 tracks. On the Sweet interview, Hamasaki hinted that there is a hidden word in the title of the mini-album, 'H♡PE', which was figured out by her fans. They predicted that Five was released not only because it has 5 songs, it was also 5 months after the disastrous earthquake and tsunami that hit Japan in March. For the first time, Hamasaki undertook the artwork of the font design herself.

Track listing

Charts
Oricon Sales Chart (Japan)

G-Music Chart (Taiwan)

Certifications

References

External links
Oricon Profile CD+DVD | CD-Only | CD-Only Limited Press

Ayumi Hamasaki EPs
2011 EPs
Avex Group EPs
Japanese-language EPs